Halifax City Soccer Club is a Canadian soccer club located in Halifax, Nova Scotia.  It was founded in 2006 as a merger between Halifax City Wanderers and Halifax Celtic.

The club has a number of teams for different levels and ages, and for both male and female players.  The senior Men's team is known, for sponsorships reasons, as Halifax City Cushman & Wakefield.

Sponsors 
Coldwell Banker (2007)
Elephant & Castle (2010)
Cushman & Wakefield (2011)

Achievements 
Canadian National Challenge Cup
4th: 2007 (Matthew Budreski 3 goals and Ryan Haughn, Mark Sweetapple, Kristin Kirincich 1 goal each)
6th: 2008, 2005 (as Coldwell Banker Celtic)
7th: 2009
Nova Scotia Soccer League Senior Men A
Champions: 2013, 2012, 2009, 2008, 2007

References

External links
Official website

Association football clubs established in 2006
Soccer clubs in Nova Scotia
Sport in Halifax, Nova Scotia
2006 establishments in Nova Scotia